The 1992 DFB-Supercup, known as the Panasonic DFB-Supercup for sponsorship purposes, was the 6th DFB-Supercup, an annual football match contested by the winners of the previous season's Bundesliga and DFB-Pokal competitions.

The match was played at the Niedersachsenstadion in Hanover, and contested by league champions VfB Stuttgart and cup winners Hannover 96. Stuttgart won the match 3–1 for their first title.

Teams

Match

Details

See also
 1991–92 Bundesliga
 1991–92 DFB-Pokal

References

1992
VfB Stuttgart matches
Hannover 96 matches
1992–93 in German football cups